Kochegury is a rural locality (a selo) and the administrative center of Kochegurenskoye Rural Settlement, Chernyansky District, Belgorod Oblast, Russia. The population was 908 as of 2010. There are 6 streets.

Geography 
Kochegury is located 25 km northwest of Chernyanka (the district's administrative centre) by road. Protochnoye is the nearest rural locality.

References 

Rural localities in Chernyansky District